Soniya Bhatta (born 4 January 2002) is a Nepali professional judoka, she represents Nepal internationally in Judo Tournament in the Extra-lightweight (48 kg) event.

Career
in 2018 she  Participated at the 2018 Summer Youth Olympics (III Summer Youth Olympic Games).
in 2019 she won a bronze medal in the 2019 South Asian Games.
Currently she is World No 127 in female -48 kg Division of World Ranking List at World Judo List.

Achievements

2020 Summer Olympic 
She has qualified after the last qualifying Invitational spots from International Judo Federation (IJF) to represent Nepal in Women's 48 kg (Extra-lightweight)  at the Judo competition of the 2020 Summer Olympics in Tokyo, Japan.

Tournaments Record

References

External links
 

2002 births
Living people
Nepalese female judoka
South Asian Games bronze medalists for Nepal
South Asian Games medalists in judo
Judoka at the 2018 Summer Youth Olympics
Olympic judoka of Nepal
Judoka at the 2020 Summer Olympics
21st-century Nepalese women